Samuel Gross (originally Samuel Marguiles) (May 9, 1891 – September 13, 1934) was a Private in the United States Marine Corps, 23d Company who earned the Medal of Honor for his efforts during the United States occupation of Haiti in 1915.

Biography
Gross was born in Philadelphia, Pennsylvania. During the United States occupation of Haiti, he participated in battles against the Caco bandit insurgency. During the battle for Fort Riviere, he saved the life of Smedley Butler, who also was a Medal of Honor recipient and was one of only 19 people to receive 2 Medals of Honor.

He died September 9, 1934, and is buried in Har Nebo Cemetery in Philadelphia.

Medal of Honor citation
Rank and organization: Private, U.S. Marine Corps, 23d Co. (Real name is Marguiles, Samuel.) Born: May 9, 1891, Philadelphia, Pa. Accredited to: Pennsylvania.

Citation:

Following a concentrated drive, several different detachments of marines gradually closed in on the old French bastion fort in an effort to cut off all avenues of retreat for the Caco bandits. Approaching a breach in the wall which was the only entrance to the fort, Gross was the second man to pass through the breach in the face of constant fire from the Cacos and, thereafter, for a 10-minute period, engaged the enemy in desperate hand-to-hand combat until the bastion was captured and Caco resistance neutralized.

See also

List of Jewish Medal of Honor recipients
List of Medal of Honor recipients

Notes

References

1891 births
1934 deaths
United States Marines
United States Marine Corps Medal of Honor recipients
Military personnel from Philadelphia
Jewish Medal of Honor recipients
United States Marine Corps personnel of World War I
Occupation of Haiti recipients of the Medal of Honor
20th-century American Jews